Ascetostoma providentiae is a species of sea snail, a marine gastropod mollusc in the family Chilodontidae.

Distribution
This species occurs in the southwest Indian Ocean.

References

 Melvill, JC, 1909, Report on the marine Mollusca obtained by Mr. J. Stanley Gardiner, F.R.S., among the Islands of the Indian Ocean in 1905; Transactions of the Linnean Society, ser.2 v. 13 pp. 65-139, 1 pl
 Poppe G.T., Tagaro S.P. & Dekker H. (2006) The Seguenziidae, Chilodontidae, Trochidae, Calliostomatidae and Solariellidae of the Philippine Islands. Visaya Supplement 2: 1-228. page(s): 69

External links
 To World Register of Marine Species

providentiae
Gastropods described in 1909